"Amsterdam" is a song written and recorded by American rock band Imagine Dragons, for their third self-released extended play, It's Time. It appears as the second track on the EP. The song was later reproduced and remastered for inclusion on their debut album Night Visions and appears as the sixth track on the album.

Composition

The song, originally featured on the band's It's Time EP released in March 2011, was one of the earliest Imagine Dragons songs to incorporate electronic music into their traditional rock band set-up evident in their earlier works. The song, along with most of the It's Time EP, used electronic music to create the timbre and texture of the song rather than forming the melodies and riffs of the song. A similar concept was first used by the band for "Hear Me", a song off their 2010 extended play Hell and Silence.

Release
"Amsterdam" was first released officially on December 31, 2010 through a music video posted on their YouTube channel. It was exclusively released as a free download via iTunes for a limited time. The song was released as iTunes' "Single of the Week" on the week of the album's release in countries with respective release dates of the album. The single was first released in North America on the American September 4, 2012 release date, and again in European countries on the European February 7, 2013 release date of the album.

Live performances
"Amsterdam" is one of the band's most played songs, being played at an excess of over 300 concerts since its first play on August 6, 2010. The song was also a regular on the setlist of the band's Night Visions tour, on which they embarked in 2013. The song was usually played after the setlist opener "Round and Round".

Track listing

Personnel
Adapted from Night Visions liner notes.

Imagine Dragons
Ben McKeebass
Dan Reynoldslead vocals
Wayne Sermonguitar
Daniel Platzmandrums
Brittany Tolmanbacking vocals, keyboard

Additional personnel
Brandon Darner – co-producer
 Mark Everton Gray – recording
 Mark Needham – mixing
 Will Brierre – engineer
 Joe LaPorta – mastering

Charts

Certifications

Release history

References

Imagine Dragons songs
Songs written by Wayne Sermon
Songs written by Dan Reynolds (musician)
Songs written by Ben McKee
2012 singles
2010 songs
Kidinakorner singles
Interscope Records singles
Songs written by Daniel Platzman
Songs about Amsterdam